Audunbakkenfestivalen is a small rock festival held in Norway, in Disenå in Sør-Odal municipality, about 18 miles from Kongsvinger and 44 miles from Oslo. The festival area is located up in the woods opposite Disenå Sport Square. 

The festival was first organized in 2003 and spans two days, usually in early August. In 2005 the festival was named Norway's third best rock festival by the Norwegian Rock Federal.

References

External links
Official site

 
Rock festivals in Norway
Recurring events established in 2003